Cipuropsis subandina is a species of flowering plant in the family Bromeliaceae, native to northeastern Peru. It was first described by Ernst Heinrich Georg Ule in 1907.

References

Tillandsioideae
Flora of Peru
Plants described in 1907